The Sumida M.2593 (Type 91) was an armoured car produced by the Empire of Japan in the 1930s. It could operate on both the roadway and railway lines.

History 
Designed by the Sumiya firm, beginning in 1933 the M.2593 was produced at the Ishikawajima Motor Works. A defining feature of this vehicle is that its six road wheels could be exchanged for flanged railway wheels. When not in use, the tires would be secured to the sides of the hull. The vehicle had four built-in jacks for use when the wheels were changed. It would take ten to twenty minutes to change the wheels. The front and rear sets of wheels could even be adjusted to various rail gauges. The car was capable of 25 mph (40 km/h) on road and traveling at higher speeds on rails, going up to 37 mph (60 km/h).

The car was successful in covering great distances in the 1937 invasion of China. They were also used in Manchuria, to "guard railway lines". They could be coupled together and operate on the rails like "rolling stock". This led them to be used in joint operations with trains and were used for reconnaissance by the army. The M.2593 had a crew of six men, and was armed with either one 6.5 mm machine gun or one 7.7 mm machine gun.

Variants
One version of the Type 91 armoured railroad car was produced without a main fixed machine gun for armament.

A second variant produced by Ishikawajima was known as the Sumida Model P armored car. It was used by the Special Naval Landing Forces (SNLF) of the Imperial Japanese Navy (IJN).

Gallery

Notes

References 

Trewhitt, Philip, and Chris McNab (2004). Fighting Vehicles of the World: over 600 Tanks and AFVS of the World. London: Amber.

External links
Taki's Imperial Japanese Army Page - Akira Takizawa

Armoured cars of Japan
Isuzu
Armoured cars of the interwar period
World War II armoured fighting vehicles of Japan
Military vehicles introduced in the 1930s
Military draisines
Rail and road vehicle